This is a list of members of the European Parliament for France in the 2004 to 2009 session, ordered by name.

See 2004 European Parliament election in France for a list ordered by constituency.

List

Footnotes

2004
France
List